Asclepias verticillata, the whorled milkweed, eastern whorled milkweed, or horsetail milkweed, is a species of milkweed native to most of eastern North America and parts of western Canada and the United States.

Description
This is a perennial herb with a single stem 6 inches to 3 feet tall. The very narrow, linear leaves are arranged in whorls of 4–6 with short internodes. The inflorescence is an umbel of 7–20 greenish white flowers. Flowers are fragrant and bloom between June and September. Its native habitats include glades, dry prairies, dry slopes, dry open woods, pastures, fields, and roadsides. The Latin specific epithet verticillata is in reference to the leaves appearing in whorls.

Ecology
This species can reproduce vegetatively and does not depend on pollinators, but it does produce some nectar, mostly in the early evening hours. Insect visitors to the plant include wasps, honeybees, and lepidopterans such as moths and the cabbage white. Like other milkweed species, this plant is a host plant for the monarch butterfly whose caterpillars feed on the leaves.

The plant is toxic to livestock.

Uses
It was used as a medicinal plant by Native American peoples. The Choctaw used it to treat snakebite, the Lakota and Hopi used it to increase breast milk in nursing mothers, and the Navajo used it for nose and throat problems.

References

verticillata
Butterfly food plants
Flora of North America
Plants described in 1753
Taxa named by Carl Linnaeus